Cobb Field was a baseball park located in Billings, Montana from 1932 to 2007.  It was originally named Athletic Park and opened as Cobb Field on May 4, 1948 after renovations. It was the home of the Billings Mustangs, the Pioneer League Rookie Affiliate of the Cincinnati Reds, from 1948-2007.  Cobb Field was named after Bob Cobb, who was responsible for bringing the Mustangs to Billings.  It also hosted home games for local American Legion baseball teams. In 2006, the stadium welcomed the re-formed NCAA baseball team from nearby Montana State University Billings. From March to May, home games were played at the field.

Features
Cobb Field had a natural grass surface. The dimensions were 335 feet to left, 405 feet to center, and 325 feet to right. Cobb Field sat 4,200, though crowds had been known to eclipse 5,000. The stadium was primarily made up of the same wood used when it had been built and had shown substantial wear. Many areas of the stadium had needed wooden boards to be installed over holes in the floor.  

Cobb Field's concessions had undergone a drastic overhaul in its last few years.  In addition to the basic concession items, the Mustangs added the "Cobb Grill" and "Betisse's Bullpen", a patio on the left field line where Mustangs fans can enjoy a beer and roam about freely. "Betisse's Bullpen" also hosted pre-game tailgate parties.

Cobb Field film
Producers Craig Lindvahl and Joseph Fatheree created a film about the ballpark entitled Cobb Field, A Day at the Ballpark.  The film gives a view of the world of minor league baseball from the eyes of the ballpark. It was shot during the final weeks of Cobb Field's existence. The film won Mid-America Emmys in three categories:  Promotional Video, Musical Composition, and Photography. Lindvahl and Fatheree teach a film class at Effingham High School in Effingham, IL. Some of their students helped in the filming of the movie. Three of these students helped in the filming of Cobb Field and also won Mid-America Emmys for their film work.

New stadium
On November 8, 2006, a $12.5 million stadium levy passed (with a 53% majority 'for' vote) allowing construction of a new stadium at the Cobb Field location. Construction began in the Spring of 2007 and Cobb Field was torn down after the 2007 season.  The new stadium opened as Dehler Park on June 29, 2008.

References

External links
Minor League Ballparks Cobb Field
Cobb Field Views - Ball Parks of the Minor Leagues
Cobb Field: A Day at the Ballpark

Minor league baseball venues
College baseball venues in the United States
Baseball venues in Montana
Sports venues in Billings, Montana
1932 establishments in Montana
Defunct sports venues in Montana
2007 disestablishments in Montana
Sports venues completed in 1932
Sports venues demolished in 2007